The 2010 Monaco Grand Prix (officially the Formula 1 Grand Prix de Monaco 2010) was the sixth round of the 2010 Formula One season. It was held in the streets of Monaco on 16 May 2010 and was won by Red Bull's Mark Webber.

Report

Background
Reigning World Champion and 2009 race winner Jenson Button went into the Monte Carlo round with a three-point lead over Ferrari's Fernando Alonso and a ten-point margin over Sebastian Vettel. In total, seven drivers were in a position to take the lead of the championship had they won in the Principality.

Following concerns over the tight and narrow nature of the circuit combined with new teams Virgin Racing, Lotus and Hispania being between three and six seconds slower than the established teams over the course of a lap and therefore creating a very real possibility for a slower car compromising the flying laps of their faster counterparts, the suggestion was put forth to split the first session of qualifying into two groups of twelve cars, similar to the format used by the IndyCar Series. However, at the Spanish Grand Prix, one week before the Monaco race, the proposal was rejected by several teams. The FIA later set a maximum allowable lap time for qualifying, with any car that is slower than one minute and twenty-two seconds between the first and last corners facing penalties from the stewards. The concerns over slow traffic attracted criticism, with  World Champion Keke Rosberg saying "there used to be twenty-six drivers out there in the old days, and half of them were slow – not just half a dozen!", while Lotus Racing's Jarno Trulli said that he felt drivers and teams have no cause for complaint if anyone is held up, saying "they have had plenty of time among the teams about what to do for here [Monaco], and they didn't come up with a solution. So I don't think anyone should start complaining now."

Several small changes were made to the circuit prior to the race. These include the raising of kerbs on the exit of the Nouvelle Chicane and in the second half of the Swimming Pool complex, as a deterrent to cars cutting the chicanes. The new kerbs were clearly visible in the new yellow colour. Several sections of the circuit, including the pit lane and the northern half of the circuit from the Place du Casino to the tunnel have been re-surfaced.

Bruno Senna had damaged his Hispania F110 during practice for the race in Barcelona. As his team was unable to find the flaw in the chassis, he competed in Monaco with a damaged car, producing lap times two seconds slower than his team-mate Karun Chandhok in free practice.

Free practice
The first practice sessions were held on the Thursday of race week, as is traditional in Monaco. Fernando Alonso was the fastest driver and the only man to break the   barrier, though second-placed Sebastian Vettel set a time of 1:16 even, with Renault's Robert Kubica one hundredth of a second behind him. Virgin's Timo Glock was the fastest of the new teams, three and a half seconds slower than Alonso and one second behind Kamui Kobayashi, the last of the drivers for an established team. The first session was incident-free with the exception of Karun Chandhok stopping on the circuit after completing just six laps when he brushed the barriers and spun at Massanet. Kobayashi also encountered trouble, running over the chicanes at the entry to the Swimming Pool and finding the barriers. Alonso was also sighted pitting for a replacement front wing.

The second practice session was considered wet, though the rain was not heavy enough to justify the use of the intermediate tyres. Alonso once again topped the session, this time breaking the   barrier with Nico Rosberg and Vettel rounding out the top three. Lotus' Heikki Kovalainen was the fastest of the new teams, one second adrift of Jaime Alguersuari in eighteenth position. There were no major incidents, though the anticipated traffic problem manifested on several occasions, with the Ferrari of Felipe Massa impeding Kovalainen and his Lotus as the Finn was completing a flying lap.

The third practice session opened with a heavy accident by Alonso, the Spaniard crashing his Ferrari at Massanet after completing just six laps; his fastest recorded time for the session would ultimately be enough for sixteenth. Virgin's Timo Glock also stopped with hydraulics issues after a sequence of installation laps and failing to set a time. Renault's Kubica was the fastest of the session, edging out Alonso's Ferrari team-mate Massa by four hundredths of a second and  winner Mark Webber third. At the end of the session, just half a second covered the top seven drivers. Lotus was once again the fastest rookie team, with Heikki Kovalainen just a tenth of a second quicker than team-mate Trulli.

Qualifying
Following the practice session, Ferrari judged the damage to Alonso's car to be too extensive to repair in time for qualifying. This forced the double World Champion to revert to the team's spare chassis for the race and start from pit lane.

With Alonso out, several teams – notably Renault – sent their drivers out on the harder compound tyres, and the remaining six drivers to be eliminated were the six drivers for the new teams. Heikki Kovalainen was the fastest of them; it was the first time team-mate Jarno Trulli was out-qualified at Monaco by his team-mate. The Lotus cars were followed by the two Virgins and the two Hispanias. Despite his damaged car, Bruno Senna out-qualified Karun Chandhok. The anticipated traffic problems did not arise, and Felipe Massa set the fastest time of the session.

The second session was marked by an accident in the final few minutes, with Vitaly Petrov slipping into the tyre wall at Ste. Devote, though the session was not stopped. His time was fast enough for fourteenth although Nico Hülkenberg, Adrian Sutil and Sébastien Buemi all qualified ahead of Petrov, with Pedro de la Rosa, Kamui Kobayashi and Jaime Alguersuari also being eliminated. Mercedes' Nico Rosberg was the fastest man in the session.

The third and final part of qualifying was led by Robert Kubica for over half the session, a whole second ahead of the opposition, before Mark Webber managed to set a lap time of 1:13.826 to steal pole position away from him and continue Red Bull's unbroken run of pole positions with their sixth-straight start from pole. Kubica qualified in second place, with Sebastian Vettel taking third ahead of Felipe Massa. Lewis Hamilton qualified fifth ahead of Nico Rosberg and Michael Schumacher; team principal Ross Brawn later expressed frustrations by a mistake by the team that saw Rosberg inadvertently block his team-mate. Jenson Button, Rubens Barrichello and Vitantonio Liuzzi completed the top ten.

Race
At the start, Kubica attempted to block Vettel and protect second place, but the German driver held his line into Ste. Devote and won the position. Rubens Barrichello was the big winner, managing to forge through to sixth place, while Schumacher overtook his team-mate. The first lap saw Nico Hülkenberg crash in the tunnel when a front wing mounting failed. A problem with his clutch had previously forced him to abort his warm-up lap and line up at the back of the grid, and his accident triggered a safety car period that lasted for several laps, and Fernando Alonso took the opportunity to pit early, swapping his super-soft tyres in favour of the harder compound. It was a move that would dictate most strategies up and down the pit lane given that every car was planning on stopping just once. Reigning World Champion and 2009 winner Jenson Button was the race's second retirement with an overheating engine – the result of a bung being left in an air intake on the grid by an engineer – ending his day on the second lap. He also parked his car on the exit to the pit lane, meaning Bruno Senna had to cross the yellow line to avoid the McLaren after completing his pitstop, due to this he did not receive a penalty.

The first round of stops began earlier than anticipated, with the majority of teams and drivers attempting to time their stops in such a way that they would come out ahead of Alonso's Ferrari. Nico Rosberg was the exception to the rule, preferring instead to stay out in an attempt to open a buffer between himself and the Spaniard. The gamble did not pay off, however, as Rosberg eventually emerged from the pits to find himself behind Alonso and a train of cars that had exited from the pits immediately in front of him. While pit strategy dictated the running order, both Saubers and both Virgins retired from the race.

As Webber began to solidify his lead, Rubens Barrichello suffered a suspension failure due to a loose drain cover at the top of Beau Rivage, and the Brazilian's out-of-control Williams hit the barrier and spun around, coming to a halt facing the wrong way in the middle of the track at Massanet. Karun Chandhok then ran over Barrichello's discarded steering wheel, which he had thrown out of the car after the crash. The safety car was deployed for the second time, bunching the field back up. Webber survived the restarts with his lead intact, though the safety car would again take control of the race a few laps later. A marshal at Massanet reported that a manhole cover had come loose, and with the pressure generated by a speeding Formula One car being more than enough to rip it free of its mountings, race control deployed the safety car while the situation could be assessed. It was decided that the cover was safe, and the race resumed within three laps of the safety car taking to the circuit. It was later discovered that the loose manhole cover had been the cause of Barrichello's accident, being lifted up as the car passed over it, striking the left rear wheel and breaking the suspension.

Bruno Senna and Heikki Kovalainen joined the growing list of retirements, both exiting the race on the same lap with mechanical troubles. The safety car would again be deployed during the 70th lap and remain in place until the race's final corner when Jarno Trulli and Hispania's Karun Chandhok collided. Trulli attempted a pass at Rascasse that resulted in his Lotus mounting Chandhok's car and his wheels narrowly missing Chandhok's head. Both drivers walked away from the crash. The incident occurred just in front of race leader Webber, who avoided being caught up in the tangle. Webber went on to win a race with all but a few seconds of the last few laps run under safety car conditions during which Vitaly Petrov retired his Renault with brake problems.

During the eight or nine seconds between Webber crossing the safety car line, with the green restart lights illuminated, and Webber finishing the race, Schumacher overtook Alonso in the final corner for sixth place to finish 5.7 seconds behind the winner. The rule 40.7 states that after the safety car has returned to the pitlane, drivers may only overtake once they have passed the white safety car line spanning the width of the circuit; in Monaco, this line is at the exit to Rascasse. Replays showing Schumacher's manoeuvre were shown shortly after the race and controversy started with Ferrari claiming that overtaking on the last lap was not permitted, according to rule 40.13, which states: "If the race ends whilst the safety car is deployed it will enter the pit lane at the end of the last lap and the cars will take the chequered flag as normal without overtaking." Mercedes principal Ross Brawn produced documents to show that the restart had taken place (thus the 40.13 rule was not applicable in his opinion) and Schumacher's position beyond the safety car line before the overtaking.

Webber's victory meant that he was the first Australian to win the Monaco Grand Prix since Sir Jack Brabham in 1959. Webber also assumed the lead in the championship on seventy-eight points, the same amount as his team-mate Sebastian Vettel (however, with two wins this season to Vettel's one, Webber is still classified as sole championship leader). Robert Kubica finished third ahead of Felipe Massa and Lewis Hamilton, with Alonso sixth after Schumacher's penalty. Alonso's result moved him to third in the standings, just ahead of the non-finishing Button. Red Bull's one-two finish also meant that they leap-frogged Ferrari in the constructors' standings, establishing a twenty-two point lead. Combined with Button's retirement, Lewis Hamilton's fifth place meant that McLaren fell from first to third overall.

Post-race
The stewards, including  champion Damon Hill, held an enquiry after the race, and gave Schumacher a 20-second penalty for illegally passing Alonso, demoting him to 12th position. Mercedes announced its intention to appeal against the decision, although the penalty cannot be rescinded as it is classed as a drive-through penalty, a type of penalty which is not open to appeal. The team later chose not to pursue an appeal after the FIA agreed to hold talks on the subject of the safety car rules. The FIA later admitted that the rules suffered from a "lack of clarity" and sought to change the rules in order to clarify the regulations and make it easier for teams to understand exactly what was required of them in such a scenario.

The safety car rule in Formula One is unique compared to other sanctioning bodies of motorsport in regards to last-lap yellow chequer finishes.  Most sanctioning bodies require the safety car to lead the leader across the finish line on the final lap in case of a yellow chequer.  In Formula One, the safety car does not lead the leader across the finish line on the last lap.

Classification

Qualifying 

Notes:
1. – Nico Hülkenberg stalled on warm-up lap and started from back of the grid. His grid spot was left vacant.
2. – Fernando Alonso was unable to take part in qualifying following an accident at Massenet corner in the third practice session. He was cleared to compete, and opted to start the race from the pit lane.

Race 

Notes:
1. – Michael Schumacher originally finished sixth, but received a 20-second penalty for passing Fernando Alonso on the last corner of the race under safety car conditions.
2. – Vitaly Petrov, Karun Chandhok, and Jarno Trulli were all classified as they had completed 90% of the winner's race distance (rounded down to 70 laps).
3. – Barrichello's accident was caused by a manhole cover which damaged his rear suspension.

Championship standings after the race

Drivers' Championship standings

Constructors' Championship standings

 Note: Only the top five positions are included for both sets of standings.

See also 
 2010 Monaco GP2 Series round

References

External links

Monaco Grand Prix
Monaco Grand Prix
Grand Prix
May 2010 sports events in Europe